Archery at the 2009 Southeast Asian Games was held at the archery range at the National Sports Complex in Vientiane, Laos from 12 to 16 December 2009.

Medal summary

Results

Recurve

Compound

External links
 25th SEA Games Official Report

Archery at the Southeast Asian Games
Archery in Laos
2009 Southeast Asian Games events